Four Billion in Four Minutes (Italian: 4 minuti per 4 miliardi) is a 1976 Italian crime thriller film directed by Gianni Siragusa and starring Antonio Sabato, John Richardson and Vassili Karis. A gang plot to blast their way into a Genoese bank and steal four billion lire.

It is also known by the alternative title Quelli dell'antirapina.

Cast
 Antonio Sabato as Raffaele 
 John Richardson as Francesco Vitale 
 Vassili Karis as Aldo 
 Attilio Severini as Sandro 
 Lea Lander as Peggy 
 Serafino Profumo as Marco 
 Giovanni Brusadori
 Pippo Pollaci as Carcerato 
 Saverio Mosca as Direttore carcere

References

Bibliography 
 Curti, Roberto. Italia odia: il cinema poliziesco italiano. Lindau, 2006.

External links 
 

1976 films
Italian crime thriller films
1970s crime thriller films
1970s Italian-language films
Films directed by Gianni Siragusa
Films set in Genoa
Italian heist films
1970s Italian films